Líneas Aéreas Inter Islas, S.R.L., doing business as Air Inter Island, is a Dominican Republic-based air carrier that operates domestics and international flights in the Dominican Republic and Haiti.

History
The airline was founded August 15, 2003 by Martin Maldonado Frómeta.

Following the purchase of a first aircraft, a Britten Norman Islander, series BN-2A-8 on June 8, 2003 in Fort Lauderdale, Florida, the company operates as an "on-demand" charter airline serving the Dominican Republic and Haiti. The airline's initial main route was a daily service between Punta Cana and Samana (Arroyo Barril Airport).

On November 27, 2009, Air Inter Island received its AOC from the Instituto Dominicano de Aviacion Civil-IDAC.

Hubs
Air Inter Island's main base is at Punta Cana International Airport in Punta Cana, Higuey.

Destinations
As of January 2015 no schedules flights are on offer; only charter-on-demand in the Dominican Republic, and Haiti is available.

Fleet

 1 Piper Cherokee Six

References

External links

Airlines of the Dominican Republic